World of Warcraft: Shadowlands is the eighth expansion pack for the massively multiplayer online role-playing game (MMORPG) World of Warcraft, following Battle for Azeroth. It was announced and made available for preorder at BlizzCon on November 1, 2019. Originally scheduled for release on October 27, 2020, its release was delayed until November 23, the sixteenth anniversary of the release of the original game.

The expansion opens up the Shadowlands, the realm of the dead in Warcraft lore. It features the game's first "level squish" and a completely overhauled leveling system, access to the Death Knight class for the races that did not previously have access to it, Covenants in the new zones, and new dungeons and raids.

On February 20, 2021, Chains of Domination (Patch 9.1) was announced. A new location, Korthia, was added to the Shadowlands. Chains of Domination also released a new raid called "Sanctum of Domination" which features iconic World of Warcraft character Sylvanas Windrunner as the final boss. The patch went live on June 29, 2021 for the US region, and on June 30 for EU.

On February 22, 2022, Eternity's End (Patch 9.2) was released, including a new zone known as Zereth Mortis, home of the originators of all reality. A new raid, "The Sepulcher of the First Ones", concludes the story of Shadowlands by having the expansion's main antagonist, Zovaal the Jailer, as its final boss.

Gameplay

Shadowlands involves a level reduction ("level squish") with player characters at level 120 (the level cap in Battle for Azeroth) reduced to level 50, with level 60 being the new level cap (as it had been in the original game). In what Blizzard has called a "New Game+ experience", newly created characters have an updated starting experience on an island called "Exile's Reach", which introduces them to the game and its systems. For players new to World of Warcraft, characters who finish the starting experience on Exile's Reach proceed to Battle for Azeroth content, while veteran players who create new characters can choose the expansion experience they wish to play through to level 50, at which point they proceed to the Shadowlands.

Shadowlands features five major zones - Bastion, Ardenweald, Revendreth, Maldraxxus, and the Maw. In the center is the city of Oribos, which functions as the main player hub similar to Shattrath City in Outland in The Burning Crusade or Dalaran in Wrath of the Lich King and Legion. There are four new dungeons for leveling, four more at maximum level, and a new raid. In addition, a new roguelike "endless dungeon" called Torghast, Tower of the Damned, was introduced for both solo and group play.

All playable core races (not allied races) received new customization options (for example, humans are able to customize their ethnicities, dwarves and trolls gain tattoos, and undead are able to show varying degrees of decay). The Death Knight class (added in Wrath of the Lich King) was opened up to pandaren (added in Mists of Pandaria) and to all allied races (added in Legion and Battle for Azeroth); players who pre-ordered Shadowlands received access to death knights for these races with the release of Patch 8.3.0, Battle for Azeroths last major content patch, on January 14, 2020.

Covenants
The four zones that comprise the Shadowlands are ruled by "Covenants", similar to the Class Orders introduced in Legion. Each Covenant has its own campaign, similar to the War Campaign in Battle for Azeroth, with gear specific to the faction and abilities both universal and determined by class. The four covenants are the Kyrian of Bastion, the Night Fae of Ardenweald, the Venthyr of Revendreth, and the Necrolords of Maldraxxus. Players experiencing the Shadowlands content for the first time are required to reach level 60 before they can choose to pledge themselves to a Covenant, while alternative characters are able to do so at the start of the Shadowlands content.

Throughout the Covenant campaigns players will be able to insert conduits into the "Forge of Bonds," a system which increases a player's stats and abilities. The Covenant campaigns also introduced a progression system known as Renown, which when raised gives the players rewards. The maximum Renown you could have at the launch of the game was 40, although this was increased to 80 with the Chains of Domination update. Completing dungeons and raids on any difficulty also awards players with Renown for the Covenant that they have chosen.

Torghast, Tower of the Damned
Shadowlands introduced a rogue-like dungeon at launch, Torghast, Tower of the Damned. Parts of the Shadowlands campaign are centered in Torghast. The tower introduced runecarving memories, which you can augment into items to make them more powerful. In order to make these legendary items you need an armour or jewellery piece that coincides with your armour type as well as Soul Ash, a currency found while progressing through Torghast. Players wishing to create the highest power legendary items must embark on difficult challenges on the highest levels of Torghast to obtain a second currency, Soul Cinders.

Plot

Death Rising
After Sylvanas Windrunner murdered High Overlord Saurfang using otherworldly powers (at the end of Battle for Azeroth), she traveled to Icecrown Citadel and destroyed the Lich King's Helm of Domination, which tears a rift in the sky above Icecrown, leading to the Shadowlands, the realm of the dead. Dark angelic figures kidnap King Anduin Wrynn, former Warchief Thrall, tauren chieftain Baine Bloodhoof and Lady Jaina Proudmoore and hold them in Torghast, the maze-like Tower of the Damned within the Maw. The Cult of the Damned, previously aligned with the Scourge, are now in the service of the "Banished One", and conduct attacks in Icecrown and elsewhere. Aided by Azeroth's champions, Tyrande Whisperwind - empowered by the moon goddess Elune as the "Night Warrior", after the burning of the World Tree Teldrassil - confronts Sylvanas' consort, Nathanos Blightcaller, outside his former homestead in the Eastern Plaguelands of Lordaeron. After he refuses to tell her where Sylvanas is, Tyrande kills him.

Into the Shadowlands
The Knights of the Ebon Blade (the order of Death Knights who had broken from the Scourge in Wrath of the Lich King) travel to Stormwind and Orgrimmar to rally the heroes of Azeroth. At the Frozen Throne atop Icecrown Citadel, they open a portal to travel into the Shadowlands using the fragments of the Helm of Domination and arrive in the Maw, a place of eternal damnation. The heroes make their way through the armies of Zovaal the Jailer, the "Banished One" who rules the Maw; it is revealed that Sylvanas has made a pact with the Jailer. Upon finding a waystone placed by the enigmatic "First Ones", the champions escape the Maw and wind up in Oribos, the Eternal City at the center of the Shadowlands. There, they learn that the Arbiter, who judges the souls of the dead, has gone dormant, condemning all incoming souls to the Maw. Because of this, the realms of the Shadowlands are suffering from a drought of Anima, the essence of souls. In order to discover the cause of the disruption, the attendants send the champions to the four realms of the Shadowlands: the Elysium-like Bastion, home of the angelic Kyrian; the plagued crags of Maldraxxus, home of the undead Necrolords; the forests and fields of Ardenweald, home of the enchanted Night Fae, and the castles and villages of Revendreth, home to the vampiric Venthyr.

In Bastion, the heroes discover that the spirit of Uther the Lightbringer, the first Paladin, has joined with a group of renegade Kyrian known as the Forsworn, who seek to overthrow Kyrestia the Firstborne, the Archon of Bastion. Unbeknownst to Uther, they are in the service of the Jailer. An attack by Necrolord forces leads the heroes to Maldraxxus, which is in the throes of civil war; they are joined by Draka, Thrall's mother and member of the House of the Chosen, in collecting the regalia of the Primus, the missing ruler of Maldraxxus. Ardenweald, which has suffered considerably from the drought, is afflicted by a curse connected to the Drust (who had been responsible for the witch cults in Kul Tiras during Battle for Azeroth); the heroes discover the contained spirit of Ysera, the Aspect of the green dragonflight (who had been killed in Legion). Ardenweald's ruler, the Winter Queen, is reluctant to deal with Ysera due to lingering enmity with Elune, but ultimately awakens Ysera as a spirit bound to Ardenweald. In Revendreth, the heroes discover that its ruler, Sire Denathrius, is in league with the Jailer, and has stockpiled a massive cache of Anima to feed into the Maw. Though unable to stop him from empowering the Jailer, the heroes besiege Denathrius' stronghold of Castle Nathria and defeat the Sire.

All the while, Baine, Thrall, and Jaina are recovered from Torghast thanks to the insight of former Lich King Bolvar Fordragon, but Anduin is kept hidden in secret.

Chains of Domination
Growing short on time and patience upon losing Denathrius as a pawn, Sylvanas and the Jailer force Anduin to become an agent of the Maw. The Jailer's next target is shown to be sigils held by the rulers of each realm; he begins by sending Anduin to attack the Archon and claim her sigil. At the same time, he targets the hidden realm of Korthia, where it was believed the Primus hid his sigil, and chains the landscape to Torghast. During an invasion of Ardenweald, the Jailer uses Anduin again to claim the sigil of the Winter Queen. During the ordeal, Tyrande appears and attacks Sylvanas, and tells her that she killed Nathanos. The powers of the Night Warrior fade away, allowing Sylvanas to escape, but sowing doubt in the Banshee Queen's mind about trusting the Jailer, who had not told her of Nathanos' death.

The heroes discover that the Primus has been imprisoned in Torghast under the guise of the "Runecarver", forced to craft armaments for the Jailer's Mawsworn army, as well as the Helm of Domination and Frostmourne, the regalia of the Lich King. After the heroes free him, the Primus reveals that Zovaal was the original Arbiter before the rulers of the Shadowlands banished him to the Maw for attempting to dominate all of creation, and that the dormant Arbiter now in Oribos had been created to replace him. The Primus had carved the runes of Domination into Zovaal's body when he was banished, admitting to hubris because he never believed that Zovaal would be able to turn the magic to his will. While making their preparations, the combined Covenant forces discover that they have been infiltrated by the Nathrezim, formerly thought to be demons serving the Burning Legion, but actually servants of Denathrius. It is revealed that the Nathrezim have been behind nearly every major antagonist in Warcraft lore, including the Legion and the Scourge, as part of the Jailer's plan; they are also responsible for the Anima drought, having disabled the Arbiter with the corrupted spirit of the fallen Titan Argus (killed in Legion).

In addition to dealing with the Mawsworn, the heroes are also sent to aid Uther, who has repented for his part in the Forsworn rebellion and seeks to understand the fracturing of his soul by Frostmourne. After the heroes discover the fragment taken by Frostmourne in Torghast, they return to Bastion, where Uther relives his memories, ending with his death at the hands of Arthas Menethil. His choice to keep his memories as a lesson inspire the Kyrian, who believed that purging all past memories was part of their duty, to change their methods. The heroes also seek the spirits of other Night Warriors to help save Tyrande, who is being torn apart by the Night Warrior's power. During the ritual to remove the Night Warrior's power, the Winter Queen is forced to intervene, and Tyrande is briefly possessed by the spirit of Elune herself. Elune explains the spirits of the Night Elves killed in the burning of Teldrassil were to be sent to Ardenweald, but because the Arbiter was dormant, they went to the Maw instead. This reconciles the Winter Queen to her sister, and Tyrande is restored to normal.

With the retrieval of the four covenant sigils, Revendreth's being handed over earlier by Denathrius and the Malraxxi sigil taken from the Primus in Torghast, the Jailer prepares to attack Oribos to claim the dormant Arbiter's sigil. Azeroth's champions band together with Jaina, Thrall, and Bolvar to stop the invasion by breaching the Jailer's personal fortress, the Sanctum of Domination. The incursion ends for naught as the Jailer successfully acquires the Arbiter's sigil, transforming himself into an armored behemoth. The Jailer reveals his goal of forging his own reality where all serve him, going against Sylvanas's previous desire of breaking the unfair cycle of death. Recalling Arthas' previous demand for her to serve (in Warcraft III: Reign of Chaos), Sylvanas cuts ties with the Jailer, denouncing any idea of servitude. For her aid in his cause, the Jailer "rewards" Sylvanas with the fragment of her soul that was taken by Frostmourne, which causes her to pass out at the mercy of Azeroth's leaders, as the Jailer and Anduin escape.

Eternity's End
In order to pursue the Jailer, the Primus creates new sigils to open the gateway to the mystical realm of Zereth Mortis, where the First Ones created the Shadowlands. The Jailer's plan is to enter the Sepulcher of the First Ones and reshape all of creation into one under his control. To counter his plans, champions work with a group called the Enlightened, pilgrims seeking to learn the First Ones' ways, and the Automa, created by the First Ones to protect Zereth Mortis. However, the Jailer is able to make his way into the Sepulcher. With the aid of Uther, Sylvanas' soul is restored, and she offers her aid to help defeat the Jailer; though rightfully hesitant, Bolvar and the other Azerothian leaders agree after Uther's reassurance. With her help, champions discover a waystone that opens a doorway into the Sepulcher, where the Jailer has begun his redesign of the universe.

Azeroth's champions battle their way through the Sepulcher. Eventually, Anduin is sent to annihilate the invaders, but is able to free himself from the Jailer's Domination after recalling the spirits of his father Varian and Varok Saurfang. Free of the Jailer's influence, Anduin and Sylvanas encounter and release the spirit of Arthas Menethil, as all that remained of him was a simple flickering wisp from within Anduin's broken Domination armor since it was Zovaal who was responsible for his corruption through Frostmourne. With all their allies regrouped, the might of Azeroth battles the Jailer, who has ignited the Forge of Souls beneath Icecrown Citadel to enact his plan. After a long battle, the Jailer is finally defeated. As he dies, he recalls memories of his initial betrayal of the Eternal Ones, his flawed duty as the original Arbiter, and concludes by stating his plan to unify the cosmos was meant as a preventative measure against something later to come.

With Zovaal defeated, Pelagos, an aspiring Kyrian who aided Uther in his journey, volunteers to become the new Arbiter and fill the vacancy left by its demise as he ascends into an Eternal One, being branded by the others as the most compassionate of all. Sylvanas is confronted over her actions during the War of the Thorns and the Jailer's rise to power, though Pelagos gives the final verdict to her long-time nemesis, Tyrande. Tyrande decides that Sylvanas' words of contrition, although genuine, are not enough to pay for what she did. She punishes her by sending her to the Maw, to retrieve lost souls that perished during the conflicts she had orchestrated.

Balance Restored
As everything across the realms return to normal, some leaders of Azeroth are met with conflicting decisions about their future. Within the Maw, Anduin visits with Sylvanas as she continues to search for souls, where he reveals his uncertainty about being a leader after the actions he was forced to commit while under the Jailer's influence. In Ardenweald, the Winter Queen thanks Tyrande for helping her and Elune resolve their differences, and rewards her by gifting her the seed of a world tree imbued with the souls of Night Elves who fell in Teldrassil. In the ruins of Lordaeron, Calia Menthil confesses to Lilian Voss her wariness about being accepted anywhere due to being the last member of the Menethil line, but Voss reassures her that she is home and is needed as a Forsaken.

Reception

Shadowlands has received "generally favorable" reviews with a score of 83 on Metacritic and an 8 out of 10 from IGN. PC Gamer gave the expansion an 80/100 in their review, describing Shadowlands as [a]mbitious but uneven” and “an exciting evolution of World of Warcraft.” Screen Rant claims that Shadowlands is “immensely fun,” deserving of an excellent 4/5 score. The expansion “recaptures the allure of Wrath of the Lich King while preserving the accessibility of Battle for Azeroth." PCMag wrote rated the expansion as excellent with a 4/5. Writing that “[w]hile its endgame suffers a few stumbles, Shadowlands” offers the player “meaningful narrative choices … [and] new gameplay elements that combine to make an excellent experience.” Game Informer ranked the expansion with a score of 8.75/10. They argue that “Shadowlands plays it safe with numerous … systems and structures, but … also takes chances with a deadly zone,” called The Maw alongside a fantastic roguelike run tower” known as Torghast “that’s full of surprises. As a result, Shadowlands is a satisfying addition to … World of Warcraft.”

Sales

On launch day, World of Warcraft: Shadowlands sold 3.7 million copies, breaking the expansion sales records tied by Legion and Cataclysm, and even breaking records worldwide.

Player reception

While the players' initial reaction to the launch and first weeks of Shadowlands late-game progression has been positive, the overall sentiment had gone down considerably by the time the expansion's first major patch, Chains of Domination, came out. The majority of complaints pertained to several of the game's late-game systems, the developer's tendency to artificially extend game time by time-gating important gameplay and story milestones, as well as an unusually long delay between the expansion's release and the launch of its following patches. The story also garnered significant criticism, particularly in relation to Sylvanas.

References

External links
 (archived)

2020 video games
Blizzard games
Massively multiplayer online role-playing games
MacOS games
Video games developed in the United States
Video games postponed due to the COVID-19 pandemic
Video games scored by Neal Acree
Warcraft games
Windows games
Shadowlands